Belmont is a commune in the Doubs department in the Bourgogne-Franche-Comté region in eastern France.

Personalities
It is the birthplace of Louis Pergaud (1882–1915), writer and soldier.

Population

See also
 Communes of the Doubs department

References

Communes of Doubs